Otto Arpke (16 October 1886 – 4 December 1943) was a graphic artist, illustrator, painter, and teacher at the Kunst- und Gewerbeschule in Mainz. Arpke was famous for his designs for the movie Das Kabinet des Dr Caligari and posters for the North German Lloyd shipping line.  He designed one type face, Arpke Antiqua (1928, Shriftguss type foundry) which is available in digital form as Taiko.

See also
 List of German painters

References

External links
 

1886 births
1943 deaths
German poster artists
German typographers and type designers
20th-century German painters
20th-century German male artists
German male painters